The Omaha Mavericks baseball team represents University of Nebraska Omaha, which is located in Omaha, Nebraska. The Mavericks are an NCAA Division I college baseball program that competes in the Summit League. They began competing in Division I in 2012 and joined the Summit League in 2013.

The Omaha Mavericks play all home games on-campus at Tal Anderson Field. The Mavericks have played in one NCAA Division I Tournament. Over their 8 seasons in the Summit League, they have won three Summit League regular season titles and one Summit League Tournament.

Since the program's inception in 1947, two Mavericks have gone on to play in Major League Baseball, including two-time All-Star catcher Bruce Benedict.

Conference membership history 
2012: Independent
2013–present: Summit League

Tal Anderson Field 

Tal Anderson Field is a baseball stadium in Omaha, Nebraska, that seats 1,500 people. It broke ground in 2019 and was ready for the Spring of 2021 season. The field is named for former UNO baseball standout and long-time donor/supporter Tal Anderson who owned Baxter Auto Group.  The field will be the first on-campus home for the Omaha baseball team in school history.  Prior to its construction, the team played at numerous high school and municipal facilities around Omaha.

The field will provide fixed seating for 1,500 fans as well as berm seating on each baseline for additional fans.  The field will be a state-of-the art artificial surface to extend the Mavericks' playing season.  The facility also will include a 34 foot by 25 foot video board in the outfield.  The raised concourse will serve both Anderson Field and Connie Claussen Field, the home of Omaha softball, with premium seating, a press box, concession areas and restrooms. 

The Nebraska Philanthropic Trust led the fundraising for the Omaha Baseball/Softball Complex which was done entirely through private donations.  Construction of the facility is being managed by the Tetrad Property Group with Kiewit serving as the lead contractor. "></ref>

Head coaches (Division I only) 
Records taken from the Omaha baseball record book.

Year-by-year NCAA Division I results
Records taken from the Omaha baseball record book.

NCAA Division I Tournament history
The NCAA Division I baseball tournament started in 1947.
The format of the tournament has changed through the years.
Omaha began playing Division I baseball in 2012.

Awards and honors (Division I only)

 Over their 9 seasons in Division I, one Maverick has been named to an NCAA-recognized All-America team.
 Over their 8 seasons in the Summit League, 13 different Mavericks have been named to the all-conference first-team.

All-Americans

Freshman First-Team All-Americans

Summit League Coach of the Year

Summit League Player of the Year

Summit League Pitcher of the Year

Summit League Newcomer of the Year

Taken from the Omaha baseball record book. Updated March 21, 2020.

Mavericks in the Major Leagues

Taken from Baseball Reference.

See also
List of NCAA Division I baseball programs

References

External links